Kosta Yanev (born 27 April 1983 in Burgas) is a Bulgarian footballer who currently plays as a midfielder for FC Sliven.

He is a defensive midfielder who plays in the holding midfield role or as an attacking midfielder. Despite often being used in a defensive position he is mainly an attacking player. He has been capped for the Bulgarian national team.

Career
Born in Burgas, Yanev started to play football in local club Naftex. In 2004, he was loaned to Pomorie. In 2005, Yanev returned to Naftex Burgas. After that the midfielder played for the other club from Burgas –– Chernomorets. 

In January 2008, Yanev signed with OFC Sliven 2000 and five months later joined the club champion of Bulgarian second division. Next season in the top division Kosta left excellent impressions in the football specialists with his good play. In November 2008, the national coach Plamen Markov called Yanev in Bulgaria national football team for a friendly match with Serbia.

On 24 June 2009, Yanev signed a contract for 3 years with CSKA Sofia. On 15 August 2009, he scored his first goal for the "armymen" in the 3–0 home win against Beroe Stara Zagora in a league match.

External links
 

1983 births
Living people
Bulgarian footballers
Bulgaria international footballers
First Professional Football League (Bulgaria) players
Neftochimic Burgas players
PFC Chernomorets Burgas players
OFC Sliven 2000 players
PFC CSKA Sofia players
FC Lokomotiv 1929 Sofia players
PFC Cherno More Varna players
PFC Spartak Varna players
Association football midfielders